Enallagma pictum, the scarlet bluet, is a species of damselfly in the family Coenagrionidae. They are found from New Brunswick, Canada to Maryland.

Identification 
The male is predominantly red and black while the female is light green and black.

Flight season 
Scarlet bluets have a flight season of mid May to September depending on range.

References 

Coenagrionidae
Odonata of North America
Insects of the United States
Fauna of the Northeastern United States
Insects described in 1895